Xixin Chan Temple or Soul Refreshing Chan Temple is a Buddhist temple located at the foot of Mount Gaoding, Wangcheng District, which is  north of Changsha.

History
According to the record of Shanhua County Annals, the temple was first built by Chan Master Hanyue Fazang in the 48th Year (1620) of Emperor Wanli (1573–1620) in the Ming dynasty (1368–1644) with the name Xixin An (Soul Refreshing Temple).

During the Republic of China (1912-1949), the temple was on a noble scale, it has 107 houses, 70 monks and over 400 mu lands.

During the Great Leap Forward, Xixin Chan Temple was completely destroyed.

At the beginning of 21st century, the Venerable Master Yi Cheng, swore to have the temple rebuilt. In September 2002, he appointed his close disciple, Shi Wusheng, as his deputy and told him to manage the rebuilding.

On February 24, 2008, the temple invited a Four-faced Brahma from Thailand, a national treasure enshrined by the Thai First Generation Emperor Charity Fund.

Architecture
The temple at the foot of Mount Gaoding. The temple consists of 14 buildings. The complex includes the following halls: Shanmen, Mahavira Hall, Hall of Four Heavenly Kings, Bell tower, Drum tower, Founder's Hall, Dharma Hall, Dining Room, etc.

Famous monks
Fazang
Yi Cheng
Shi Wusheng

Gallery

References

External links

Buddhist temples in Changsha
Wangcheng District
1620 establishments in China
17th-century Buddhist temples
Religious buildings and structures completed in 1620
Linji school temples